Burton Darwin "B. J." McLeod Jr. (born November 17, 1983) is an American professional stock car racing driver and team owner. He owns B. J. McLeod Motorsports, which fields entries in the NASCAR Xfinity Series (and has previously fielded entries in the NASCAR Cup and Truck Series) and co-owns Live Fast Motorsports (along with Matt Tifft and Joe Falk), a NASCAR Cup Series team which fields the No. 78 Chevrolet Camaro ZL1 which McLeod drives part-time. McLeod has previously competed in the NASCAR Xfinity Series, NASCAR Camping World Truck Series, and the ARCA Menards Series.

Racing career

Early years
Early in his career, McLeod was a go-kart and super late model driver in the Southeast. He was noted around the Southeast for being the youngest driver in several of the divisions he competed in as a teenager, including the Hooters Pro Cup. In 2000, McLeod competed in two Pro Cup races at Hickory Motor Speedway and USA International Speedway, with a best finish of 31st in the former. The following year, he ran an American Speed Association National Tour race at Fairgrounds Speedway for Herzog Motorsports, finishing 15th. After a test session with Herzog, McLeod had an agreement in place to run a limited NASCAR Busch Series schedule for the team in 2002 but it never materialized.

NASCAR

Truck Series
McLeod began racing in NASCAR's top three series in 2010, making his Camping World Truck Series debut at Martinsville Speedway in the No. 9 for Germain Racing; after qualifying 23rd, he finished 17th. The following year he split time in a partial schedule with his own team, SS-Green Light Racing and RSS Racing. In 2012, McLeod again ran a partial schedule, this time with RSS, Glenden Enterprises and Hillman Racing. For 2013, he focused on his own team and only made one race, the season finale at Homestead–Miami Speedway. The following year McLeod served as a part-time start and park driver for SS-Green Light. In 2015, while doing a part-time Xfinity schedule, McLeod again started and parked, this time for his own team. While running a 2016 full-time Xfinity schedule, McLeod came back to the Trucks with SSGLR for one race in 2016, turning in a top-fifteen, lead-lap finish at Kansas Speedway in the No. 07.

Each year since 2017 except for 2022, McLeod has made at least one start in the Truck Series each year, mostly driving start and park or other backmarker entries in the series. In 2017, he made one start for Norm Benning Racing and another two for Copp Motorsports in partnership with MB Motorsports. In 2018, McLeod failed to qualify for the season-opener at Daytona for TJL Motorsports, and then ran one race with three other teams: Beaver Motorsports, Mike Harmon Racing, and Reaume Brothers Racing. McLeod also made one additional attempt with both Harmon and Reaume's teams that year, which ended up being DNQs. McLeod made one start for Vizion Motorsports using Beaver's owner points in 2019 along with one DNQ for Jacob Wallace Racing. He returned to RBR in 2020 and 2021, attempting one race in each season.

On February 2, 2023, G2G Racing owner Tim Viens stated in an interview for TobyChristie.com that McLeod would drive for the team in the races at Las Vegas and Atlanta in March. He did not specify whether he would drive their No. 46 or No. 47 truck. Brennan Poole will also drive for G2G in those two races in whichever truck McLeod does not drive.

ARCA
In 2014, he ran an ARCA Racing Series event at Pocono Raceway for Venturini Motorsports, finishing 27th. He drove the team's No. 15 Zaxby's Toyota, substituting for the injured John Wes Townley. This has been McLeod's only ARCA start to date.

Xfinity Series

In 2015, he joined Rick Ware Racing at Iowa Speedway for his Xfinity Series debut, retiring after 68 laps due to brake troubles, and was credited with a 36th-place finish. McLeod then proceeded to bounce between different teams, starting and parking and running full races. McLeod in that season ran for RWR, a partnership between SS-Green Light Racing and Young's Motorsports, MBM Motorsports and King Autosport.

McLeod took on a full-time Xfinity schedule in 2016, his first full slate in a NASCAR national series. He ran the full schedule with his own B. J. McLeod Motorsports No. 78 car, scoring three top twenty finishes.

In 2017, he has rotated between the Nos. 78 and 8 while taking some races off to give to pay drivers as he focuses on making his team better.

Cup Series

McLeod made his Sprint Cup Series debut in the 2015 Sylvania 300, driving the No. 33 Chevrolet SS for Circle Sport. Two years later, he returned to the Cup Series and Ware for the 2017 Quaker State 400 at Kentucky, driving the No. 51. McLeod has continued to drive part-time in the No. 51 car, recording his first top 30 finish at Kansas Speedway.

In 2019, McLeod joined Ware for his Daytona 500 debut. During the race, McLeod and fellow RWR teammate Cody Ware crashed while several cars were entering pit road, with McLeod spinning into the grass in the tri-oval; despite the wreck, McLeod would continue the race and finish 19th due to most of his fellow competitors being involved in crashes throughout the race. McLeod would then participate in 17 other events for Rick Ware Racing across their No. 51, No. 52, and No. 53 cars.

McLeod returned to RWR for the 2020 Daytona 500 in the No. 52, where he, Aric Almirola, and Quin Houff crashed on the backstretch on lap 160, causing him to finish 38th. In May, McLeod expanded his B. J. McLeod Motorsports team to the Cup level, running the No. 78 for the team in several races beginning with The Real Heroes 400 at Darlington Raceway. McLeod’s team did a total of 15 races in 2020, with plans at one point to participate in the races at Martinsville and Homestead, however, the team withdrew from those two races. Also at times when BJMM was participating in some Cup races, McLeod was driving for Spire Motorsports’ no. 77 or he was not participating in those races when his no.78 was entered in.

B.J, running for his newly created Live Fast Motorsports team survived the chaos throughout the 2021 Coke Zero Sugar 400 to initially finish in 10th place. Chris Buescher would later be disqualified from 2nd place, bumping B.J up to 9th place. This race marks his first top 10 in any of the top 3 NASCAR divisions.

Team owner career

McLeod started a driver development program, known as B. J. McLeod Motorsports, running late model and K&N Pro Series East events, and fielded rides for drivers like Matt Tifft and Scott Heckert. In 2014, McLeod partnered with Tommy Regan to field a Truck Series team, the No. 45, for Regan at Iowa Speedway; despite initially having to qualify faster than two other trucks to qualify, Wauters Motorsports and the start and park ride of MB Motorsports withdrew, guaranteeing the No. 45 a spot in the race. Regan finished last after ignition problems on lap one.

The team made its NASCAR Xfinity Series debut at Daytona in 2016, fielding two cars: the No. 78 and No. 99 Fords. McLeod ran the full season in the 78 and ran the 99 part-time with drivers like Todd Peck, Stanton Barrett and Jeff Green. He also ran a third part-time team, the No. 15, in an alliance with Rick Ware Racing, with Peck driving most of the races.

In 2017, McLeod expanded to two full-time teams; originally the plan was for McLeod to drive the 78 and for Jeff Green to drive the 8 car. The team also entered a 99 car with last year's owner points; however, the team is operated by SS-Green Light Racing. McLeod took the first two races of the season off to put Clint King in the car. Later in the season, at Talladega, Green led the team's first laps and scored its first top ten finish. Green, however, would only drive one more race for the team, as McLeod slotted to the 8 car and a rotation of drivers including Tommy Joe Martins, Jordan Anderson, Angela Ruch, Stephen Young, Josh Bilicki, John Graham and Jennifer Jo Cobb drove the 78.

On October 23, 2020, McLeod and Matt Tifft purchased Archie St. Hilare's half of Go Fas Racing's charter. McLeod, Tifft, and Joe Falk will use the charter full-time in 2021 while Go Fas Racing will scale down to a part-time schedule. B.J. McLeod Motorsports will continue operating at the Xfinity level.

Motorsports career results

NASCAR
(key) (Bold – Pole position awarded by qualifying time. Italics – Pole position earned by points standings or practice time. * – Most laps led.)

Cup Series

Daytona 500

Xfinity Series

Craftsman Truck Series

ARCA Racing Series
(key) (Bold – Pole position awarded by qualifying time. Italics – Pole position earned by points standings or practice time. * – Most laps led.)

 Season still in progress
 Ineligible for series points
 Switched from Xfinity to Truck points on May 4

References

External links

 
 
 

Living people
1983 births
Racing drivers from Florida
NASCAR drivers
NASCAR team owners
People from Wauchula, Florida
ARCA Menards Series drivers